Hewitsonia intermedia is a butterfly in the family Lycaenidae. It is found in the Democratic Republic of the Congo, Uganda and north-western Tanzania. The habitat consists of forests.

The larvae feed on lichen on the trunks of trees.

References

Butterflies described in 1962
Poritiinae